Christian Television System or CTS is a South Korean religious broadcasting system for Christians.
The station has its own radio and TV.

History
The station started on December 15th of 1954 for the purpose of establishing a civil religious network.

The broadcasting system was affected by the Policy for Merger and Abolition of the Press.

See also
 No Cut News, a daily newspaper owned by the network

References

South Korean radio networks
Christian radio
Television in South Korea
Christian television networks